Harja may be
a Germanic word for "warrior", found especially as an element in given names, see Heri
Hârja, a river in Bihor County, Romania
Hârja, a village in the commune Oituz, Bacău County, Romania